Chionomys is a genus of rodent in the family Cricetidae. It contains the following species:
 Caucasian snow vole (Chionomys gud)
 European snow vole (Chionomys nivalis)
 Robert's snow vole (Chionomys roberti)

References

 
Rodent genera
Taxa named by Gerrit Smith Miller Jr.
Taxonomy articles created by Polbot